Dwight D. Eisenhower Highway (Colorado) can refer to:

Interstate 25 from Interstate 70 to Wyoming state line
Interstate 70 from Interstate 25 to Kansas state line

Interstate 25
Interstate 70